Levitin (masculine) or Levitina (feminine) is a Russian Jewish surname. It may refer to:

 Daniel Levitin (born 1957), American-Canadian cognitive psychologist, musician and writer
 Igor Levitin (born 1952), Russian politician
 Irina Levitina (born 1954), Russian-American chess player
 Lloyd Levitin (born 1932), American businessman
 Sarah Lewitinn (born 1980), American music executive and DJ
 Sonia Levitin (born 1934), German-American novelist
 Yuri Levitin (1912–1993), Russian composer

East Slavic-language surnames
Russian-language surnames
Slavic-language surnames
Russian-Jewish surnames
Levite surnames
Yiddish-language surnames